Ikotun Market also known as irepodun market is an open-air market located in Ikotun, a metropolitan city in Alimosho local government area of Lagos State. The market which is particularly known for its price-based selling technique has about 8,400 lock-up shops and over 10,000 traders-selling items ranging from foodstuff to clothes, appliances, gadgets and so on, making it one of the biggest markets in Lagos and a major contributor to the growth of the economy of the state. 

Ikotun market which is headed by a "Baba Oja" or an "Iya Oja" has several market unions ranging from fashion, food and electricity.

See also
 List of markets in Lagos

References

Retail markets in Lagos